Winter Park is a home rule municipality in Grand County, Colorado, United States. The permanent population was 999 at the 2010 census, although with 2,572 housing units within the town limits the seasonal population can be much higher.

It is home to Winter Park Resort, a ski resort owned by the City of Denver and managed by Alterra Mountain Company. The town and resort are served by the Winter Park Express ski train run by Amtrak. The area also has cross-country skiing opportunities, including Devil's Thumb Ranch. In the spring and summer, Winter Park is known for mountain biking, concerts, hiking, and fishing.

Geography 
It is bordered to the north by the town of Fraser. U.S. Route 40 passes through the town, leading south and east over Berthoud Pass  to Denver and northwest  to Granby.

It is snow-covered for about six months a year.

Climate

According to the Köppen Climate Classification system, Winter Park has a subarctic climate, abbreviated "Dfc" on climate maps.

Demographics 

As of the census of 2000, there were 662 people, 318 households, and 129 families residing in the town. The racial makeup of the town was 96.53% White, 0.15% African American, 0.60% Native American, 0.91% Asian, 0.45% from other races, and 1.36% from two or more races. Hispanics or Latinos of any race were 1.36% of the population.

There were 318 households, out of which 14.8% had children under the age of 18 living with them, 33.3% were married couples living together, 5.0% had a female householder with no husband present, and 59.4% were non-families. 38.4% of all households were made up of individuals, and 4.4% had someone living alone who was 65 years of age or older.  The average household size was 2.04 and the average family size was 2.67.

The age distribution was 12.5% under the age of 18, 11.5% from 18 to 24, 44.0% from 25 to 44, 27.0% from 45 to 64, and 5.0% who were 65 years of age or older.  The median age was 36 years. For every 100 females, there were 143.4 males.  For every 100 females age 18 and over, there were 143.3 males.

The median income for a household in the town was $44,000, and the median income for a family was $80,660. Males had a median income of $35,221 versus $27,500 for females. The per capita income for the town was $36,699.  About 3.3% of families and 9.2% of the population were below the poverty line, including 6.8% of those under age 18 and none of those age 65 or over.

Notable people 
 Elizabeth McIntyre (born 1965), freestyle skier, Olympic silver medalist; lives in Winter Park
 Ryan Max Riley (born 1979), freestyle skier, US Champion, and humorist; lived in Winter Park
 Michelle Roark (born 1974), freestyle skier, World Champion silver medalist and two-time Olympian; lived in Winter Park
 Ryan St. Onge (born 1983), freestyle skier, World Champion and two-time Olympian; lived in Winter Park

See also

Outline of Colorado
Index of Colorado-related articles
State of Colorado
Colorado cities and towns
Colorado municipalities
Colorado counties
Grand County, Colorado
Arapaho National Forest
Front Range
Winter Park Resort
Moffat Tunnel

References

External links
 Town of Winter Park official website
 The Lift public transit system
 CDOT map of the Town of Winter Park
 Winter Park Resort
 Winter Park History
 3dSkiMap of Winter Park
 

Towns in Grand County, Colorado
Towns in Colorado